The International Journal of Aging and Human Development is a peer-reviewed medical journal covering gerontology from multiple disciplinary perspectives. It was established in 1970 as Aging and Human Development, obtaining its current name in 1973. It is published eight times per year by SAGE Publications and the editor-in-chief is Julie Hicks Patrick (West Virginia University). According to the Journal Citation Reports, the journal has a 2017 impact factor of 0.881, ranking it 6th out of 7 journals in the category "Gerontology" and 67th out of 73 journals in the category "Psychology, Developmental".

References

Further reading

External links

Gerontology journals
SAGE Publishing academic journals
English-language journals
Publications established in 1970
Developmental psychology journals
8 times per year journals